The 2023 BC Men's Curling Championship, the provincial men's curling championship for British Columbia, was held from January 11 to 15 at the Chilliwack Curling Club in Chilliwack, British Columbia. The event was held in conjunction with the 2023 British Columbia Scotties Tournament of Hearts, the provincial women's curling championship.

The winning Jacques Gauthier rink represented British Columbia at the 2023 Tim Hortons Brier in London, Ontario where they finished fifth in Pool B with a 3–5 record.

Qualification process

Teams
The teams are listed as follows:

Knockout brackets

Source:

A event

B event

C event

Knockout results
All draw times listed in Pacific Time (UTC−08:00).

Draw 2
Wednesday, January 11, 2:00 pm

Draw 3
Wednesday, January 11, 7:00 pm

Draw 4
Thursday, January 12, 9:00 am

Draw 5
Thursday, January 12, 2:00 pm

Draw 6
Thursday, January 12, 7:00 pm

Draw 7
Friday, January 13, 9:00 am

Draw 8
Friday, January 13, 2:00 pm

Draw 9
Friday, January 13, 7:00 pm

Playoffs

A vs. B
Saturday, January 14, 9:00 am

C1 vs. C2
Saturday, January 14, 9:00 am

Semifinal
Saturday, January 14, 7:00 pm

Final
Sunday, January 15, 2:00 pm

References

2023 in British Columbia
Curling in British Columbia
2023 Tim Hortons Brier
January 2023 sports events in Canada
Sport in Chilliwack